Fairfax Harrison (March 13, 1869 – February 2, 1938) was an American lawyer, businessman, and writer. The son of the secretary to Confederate President Jefferson Davis, Harrison studied law at Yale University and Columbia University before becoming a lawyer for the Southern Railway Company in 1896. By 1906 he was Southern's vice-president of finance, and in 1907 he helped secure funding to keep the company solvent. In 1913 he was elected president of Southern, where he instituted a number of reforms in the way the company operated.

By 1916, under Harrison's leadership, the Southern had expanded to an  network across 13 states, its greatest extent until the 1950s. Following the United States' entry into World War I, the federal government took control of the railroads in December 1917, running them through the United States Railroad Administration, on which Harrison served. An economic boom after the war helped the company to expand its operations; Harrison worked to improve the railroad's public relations and to upgrade the locomotive stock by introducing more powerful engines. Another of his concerns was to increase the amount of railroad track and to extend the area serviced by the railway. Harrison struggled to keep the railroad afloat during the Great Depression, and by 1936 Southern was once again showing a profit. Harrison retired in 1937, intending to focus on his hobby of writing about historical subjects including the roots of the American Thoroughbred horse, but he died three months later in February 1938.

Background and early life
Harrison was born in New York City on March 13, 1869, to Burton Harrison and his wife Constance Cary. Burton had served as private secretary to Jefferson Davis, the President of the Confederate States of America during the American Civil War, and Constance Cary was a novelist. Harrison's brother, Francis Burton Harrison, was Governor-General of the Philippines from 1913 to 1921. Another brother was Archibald, and all three brothers attended Yale University. Fairfax Harrison graduated from Yale in 1890; he was a member of the Skull and Bones secret society. He went on to attend Columbia University, earning a Masters in Arts.

Railroad career

Early career
Harrison was admitted to the New York State bar in 1892 and worked for the law firm Bangs, Stetson, Tracy & MacVeagh from 1892 to 1896. He then joined the Southern Railway Company in May 1896 as a lawyer, becoming an assistant to the company's president in 1903. He served as vice-president in charge of finance and accounting from 1906. During the Panic of 1907, Harrison successfully persuaded J. P. Morgan to purchase bonds in the Southern to keep the company solvent. After the panic had subsided, Harrison was named president of the Chicago, Indianapolis and Louisville Railway, later the Monon Railroad (succeeded Ira G. Rawn after Rawn's death), which was jointly owned by Southern and the Louisville & Nashville Railroad. William Finley, president of the Southern Railway, died on November 23, 1913, and Harrison was elected as his successor eight days later. Besides the chairmanship of the Southern Railway, he was also elected to succeed Finley on three subsidiary railroads. His election was considered to be a sign of change in the Southern United States, especially in its railroads, both because he was a southerner and for his activism on behalf of the south.

First years as president
One of Harrison's first acts as president was to implement a new training program for college graduates hired by the company. Rather than being placed in supervisory roles, they were given regular entry-level jobs in the engine shops and on the building and repairing of railroad track, to give them an understanding of the basics of the railroad business. He also instituted a remedial education program for the regular workforce; they were trained in mathematics and other subjects to high school level, as well as in engine and machine-shop basics. The program was designed to help train new supervisors in the skills needed to oversee other workers.

Another of Harrison's goals was to raise the morale of the workforce and locomotive engineers; crews were assigned to the same locomotives, and senior engineers were allowed to paint their names on their engines. When business declined in 1914 Harrison reduced his salary by 20 percent, but introduced smaller and graduated cuts for other staff, with the smallest percentages at the lowest pay scales. Other efforts to improve morale included rewards for fuel efficiency and the improvement of safety, including stricter investigation of accidents.

Harrison oversaw changes in the railway's Board of Directors. Until 1915 most of the members of the board were from the northern United States but, after 1915, a majority of the board members were southerners. In 1914 there were two unusual appointments to the board: Edwin Alderman and John Kilgo. Alderman was the president of the University of Virginia and Kilgo was a bishop in the Methodist Episcopal Church.

Harrison established a foreign trade department for the railroad, hoping to take advantage of the railway's ability to connect to the Mississippi Valley and Atlantic and Gulf of Mexico ports. In 1915, when the railway lost 12 percent of its revenue owing to disruptions in trade caused by the start of World War I, Harrison was concerned about longer-term changes underway. In the annual report that year he warned stockholders that automobile ownership could severely impact railroad passenger revenues. His words proved to be prophetic, as automobiles eventually resulted in the disappearance of most passenger train traffic.

World War I

From 1913 to 1919, Harrison oversaw the extension of double-track on the railway's mainline between Washington, D.C. and Atlanta, Georgia. The project was hampered by the war effort, but eventually covered the complete  distance between the two cities. In 1916, Harrison acquired a railroad line that ran from Meridian, Mississippi to New Orleans, Louisiana. After the United States entered World War I in April 1917, some military training camps were located in the south and much of the construction material used to build them was hauled over the Southern Railway. Harrison was elected chairman of the Railroads' War Board, a coordinating committee of railroad presidents. Its five members were tasked with eliminating bottlenecks, and fostering cooperation between the various railroads.

The board's efforts failed to meet the government's expectations; in December 1917, Woodrow Wilson, the President of the United States, ordered the federal government to take control of the railroads, by establishing the United States Railroad Administration (USRA). Harrison worked for the USRA during the war and, under its regulations, was required to step down as chairman of the Southern Railway. By the time the USRA returned control of Southern in March 1920 its treasury was bare. A few years of operation returned a surplus to the company, which led to the stockholders requesting in 1923 that the railroad pay a dividend to the holders of the common stock, something Southern had never done. Harrison managed to block the request, but in March 1924 a subsequent demand was successful, and a dividend of $5 (approximately $ as of ) per share was declared. That was increased to $7 (approximately $ as of ) per share in 1926 and $8 (approximately $ as of ) in 1928.

1920s

An economic boom in the south following the end of World War I greatly increased Southern's revenues. Harrison spent a good deal of time traveling around the southern United States, endeavoring to increase southern industry. When he traveled, he used two private railroad cars, named the Carolina and the Virginia. Other railroad presidents used only one, which made Harrison's practice unique. The Carolina was a sleeping car and the Virginia was set up to serve members of the Board of Directors, with a kitchen, dining room, and observation area.

Harrison attempted to increase the power of Southern's locomotives. In 1923, engineers under his direction created the plans for the P-4 class of Pacific type locomotives, which became famous and a symbol of the Southern Railway. On a visit to England, Harrison had seen the paint scheme used by the London and North Eastern Railway, which used apple green-painted engines. Returning home in 1925, he ordered the newly delivered Pacifics painted a forest green, which he called Virginia, with gold lettering and silver trim. These engines pulled the newly refurbished passenger trains that Harrison had begun work on before the war. He also instituted new passenger lines. In 1921 the Suwannee River Special began to run between Chicago, Detroit, and Cleveland down to Tampa and St. Petersburg in Florida. The Crescent Limited began service in 1925 between New Orleans and New York, with a scheduled time for the one-way trip of 37 hours and 50 minutes.

Harrison continued the public relations and advertising efforts of his predecessors; in 1924 an advertising campaign was launched with the slogan "The Southern Serves the South", which soon became well known. Harrison also spent long hours in negotiations to secure the legal foundations of the railway, consolidating the railroad's debt and acquiring majority control of some of the smaller lines that made up the railway.

In 1926 the United States government forced the railroad to move out of its headquarters on Pennsylvania Avenue in Washington, D.C. Although Harrison threatened to take the company headquarters to Atlanta, in the end a new headquarters building was built on McPherson Square. Harrison installed a private lobby entrance leading to a private elevator to the 10th and 11th floors. The railroad took occupancy of the building in the middle of 1929.

During these years, Harrison exhibited a number of personality quirks that became legendary. One was his habit of calling in subordinates to dine with him in the executive dining room by sending them a blue chip that had the meal's conversational topic written on it. Usually the topics were intellectual rather than related to the running of the railroad. Another oddity was his refusal to use his railroad pass, which entitled him to free travel. Instead, he personally paid for his commute between his home and the railroad's offices.

Great Depression
Before the Wall Street Crash of 1929, Southern's stock sold for around $146 (approximately $ as of ), with an all-time high of just over $151 (approximately $ as of ). In 1932 the stock hit a low of $2.50 (approximately $ as of ). In 1929 Southern's freight traffic had been 8.4 billion ton-miles; it fell to 4.4 billion ton-miles in 1932. Southern's debt rose, and the company almost entered bankruptcy in 1932. Harrison ordered the payment of dividends to be halted in 1932, and many employees took pay cuts. Further efforts included a thorough check of expenses, with every item subjected to scrutiny to see what could be eliminated. By 1936 the railroad again showed a profit; this marked the turning point for the company in dealing with the Great Depression.

Harrison chose not to be reappointed as president in 1937, and nominated Ernest Norris as his successor. Harrison, who was 68 at the time, planned to concentrate on his hobby of writing historical works, but he died three months after his retirement.

Writing career
Harrison was an author as well as an industrialist, writing on Virginia history and genealogy. Among his works were a translation of the agricultural works of ancient Roman writer Marcus Porcius Cato and several books on the local history of Virginia, including The Landmarks of Old Prince William, Devon Carys, Proprietors of the Northern Neck and Virginia Carys. He also wrote on the early history of the American Thoroughbred racehorse; his work includes The Belair Stud, The Roanoke Stud, The Background of the American Stud Book, The Equine F.F.V's, The John's Island Stud,  and Early American Turf Stock. The last came out in two volumes, the first on mares in 1934, and the second on stallions in 1935. Peter Willet, a later writer on Thoroughbreds, described him as an "indefatigable researcher in American pedigrees". Harrison also served on the Executive Committee of the Virginia Historical Society, and was instrumental in the preparation of the 120-volume Virginia Historical Index.

Family, death, and legacy

Harrison married Hetty Cary in 1894. They had four children: three daughters, Ursula, Constance, and Sally, and a son, Richard. He was a member of the Episcopal Church.  Harrison was described as "physically imposing", and gray-haired in his middle age. Harry DeButts, an employee and protégé, described him as "a little cold when you first met him, but underneath he was a very warm, admirable, capable and wise man". He died on February 2, 1938, of heart disease, and was buried in Ivy Hill Cemetery in Alexandria, Virginia.  On the day after Harrison's death, The New York Times carried his obituary, but instead of a photograph of Harrison, the picture that ran with the obituary was of John Jeremiah Pelley, the president of the Association of American Railroads, who was still alive.

The College of William and Mary in Virginia holds some of his papers. A selection of his letters was published in 1944 under the title A Selection of the Letters of Fairfax Harrison. The University of Virginia library has on loan another collection of Harrison's papers. Correspondence and business files from his time as president of the Southern Railway are held by the Southern Railway Historical Society in their collection of president's files. They were loaned to the Southern Museum of Civil War and Locomotive History in 2003 and were still there in 2008.

See also
Southern Railway 1401 – single surviving locomotive from the P-4 class of Southern locomotives

Notes

Citations

References

External links
 
 
 Open Library listing of Harrison's works

1869 births
1938 deaths
20th-century American railroad executives
Historians from New York (state)
Businesspeople from New York City
Writers from New York City
Columbia University alumni
Yale University alumni
Southern Railway (U.S.)
Burials at Ivy Hill Cemetery (Alexandria, Virginia)